The Women's Downhill in the 2018 FIS Alpine Skiing World Cup involved eight events, including the season finale in Åre, Sweden.  Before the start of the season, defending discipline champion Ilka Štuhec of Slovakia suffered a season-ending injury.  Ultimately, the discipline title ended up as a battle between oft-injured eight-time discipline champion Lindsey Vonn of the USA and rising Italian skier Sofia Goggia.  Through five races, Goggia had a 63-point lead over Vonn, who had been hampered with an injury at the start of the season. Vonn won all of the last three races, earning 300 points . . . but Goggia finished second in all three, earning 240 points, to hang on to a three-point victory for the season title.

The victory in the finals was Vonn's 82nd and last World Cup victory, setting an all-time World Cup victories record for women and placing her second overall, behind only Ingemar Stenmark's 86.

The season was interrupted by the 2018 Winter Olympics from 12-24 February 2018 at Yongpyong Alpine Centre (slalom and giant slalom) at the Alpensia Sports Park in PyeongChang and at the Jeongseon Alpine Centre (speed events) in Jeongseon, South Korea.  The women's downhill was held on 21 February.

Standings

DNF = Did Not Finish
DNS = Did Not Start

See also
 2018 Alpine Skiing World Cup – Women's summary rankings
 2018 Alpine Skiing World Cup – Women's Overall
 2018 Alpine Skiing World Cup – Women's Super-G
 2018 Alpine Skiing World Cup – Women's Giant Slalom
 2018 Alpine Skiing World Cup – Women's Slalom
 2018 Alpine Skiing World Cup – Women's Combined

References

External links
 

Women's Downhill
FIS Alpine Ski World Cup women's downhill discipline titles